In Greek mythology, Ablerus (Ancient Greek: Ἄβληρος) was a Trojan soldier killed by Antilochus, son of Nestor with his lance during the Trojan War. Homer's Iliad briefly describes the killing of Ablerus at the hands of 'Nestor's Son', Antilochus, however there isn't much historical documentation of this figure from Greek mythology outside of this.

Note

References 

Homer, The Iliad with an English Translation by A.T. Murray, Ph.D. in two volumes. Cambridge, MA., Harvard University Press; London, William Heinemann, Ltd. 1924. Online version at the Perseus Digital Library.
Homer. Homeri Opera in five volumes. Oxford, Oxford University Press. 1920. Greek text available at the Perseus Digital Library.

Trojans